The Martin XB-27 (Martin Model 182) was an aircraft proposed by the Glenn L. Martin Company to fill a strong need in the United States Army Air Corps for a high-altitude medium bomber. Its design was based approximately on that of Martin's own B-26 Marauder. The XB-27 remained on paper, and no prototypes were built.

Specifications (as designed)

See also

References

Martin B-27
B-27
Twin-engined piston aircraft